Gordonia may refer to:

Biology
Gordonia (plant), a genus of flowering plants native to Southeast Asia and the Americas
Gordonia (bacterium), a genus of bacteria
Gordonia (synapsid), an extinct animal from the Permian

Other uses
Gordonia (youth movement), a Zionist youth movement
Gordonia (film), a 2010 documentary
305 Gordonia, an asteroid
USS Gordonia, an American ship
Gordonia District, a district of Cape Province, South Africa

See also
Gordon (disambiguation)

Genus disambiguation pages